Petrovka is a rural locality (a selo), the only inhabited locality, and the administrative center of Kharansky Rural Okrug of Megino-Kangalassky District in the Sakha Republic, Russia, located  from Nizhny Bestyakh, the administrative center of the district. Its population as of the 2010 Census was 1,139, of whom 520 were male and 619 female, up from 1,068 as recorded during the 2002 Census.

References

Notes

Sources
Official website of the Sakha Republic. Registry of the Administrative-Territorial Divisions of the Sakha Republic. Megino-Kangalassky District. 

Rural localities in Megino-Kangalassky District